Margaret Dianne Clark (born 1942) is an Australian children's author, using  M.D. Clark and Lee Striker as pseudonyms. Some of her most famous works are the Aussie Angels series and the young adult novel Fat Chance.

Biography
Clark holds a Bachelor of Education, a Master of Education, a Doctorate of Education, and has written over one hundred books concerning young people and making and keeping friends, sibling rivalry, school environments, and social issues, using variations of her name Margaret Clark, M.D.Clark, Margaret D Clark and the pseudonym Lee Striker.

Bibliography

Aussie Angels series

 Okay Koala (Bolinda Audio Books 2001); 
 Whale of a Time (Bolinda Audio Books,Australia, 2000); 
 Seal with a Kiss (2012); 
 Hello, Possum! (Hodder Headline, 2012); 
 Wannabe Wallaby (Bolinda Audio Books, 2002); 
 Cocky Too (Bolinda Audio Books, 2003); 
 A Horse, of Course (Hodder Headline, 2001); 
 Operation Wombat (Hodder, 2001); 
 Dollar for a Dolphin (Hodder Headline, 2001); 
 Dog on the Job (Hodder Headline, 2012); 
 Camel Breath (Hodder Headline 2001))
 Mouse Pad (Hodder Headline, 2012); 
 Duck for Luck (Hodder Headline, 2001); 
 Owl Express (Hodder Headline, 2012); 
 Pups for Sale , 
 Kidding Around (Hodder Headline, 2002); 
 Shark in the Dark (Hodder Headline, 2002))
 Llama Drama (Hodder Headline, 2002); 
 Leap Frog (Hodder Headline, 2002) )
 Penguin Parade (Hodder Headline, 2002);

Hair-Raisers series

Writing as Lee Striker.

 1. Evil at Camp Star
 2. House of the Living Dead
 5. Bite Your Head Off
 7. Teacher Torture
 9. Body Parts

Aussie Bites books

 Snap! (1997)
 Crackle!
 Pop! (1999)
 S. N. A. G. the Sensitive New Age Gladiator
 Silent Knight
 Mummy's Boy
 Willie Tell or Won't He
 Joan of Art Pokémon joe
 The Worst Nurse

Miscellaneous

 Pugwall
 Pugwall's Summer
 The Big Chocolate Bar (1991)
 Tina Tuff (1991)
 Famous for Five Minutes
 Ripper and Fang (1992)
 Plastic City (1992)
 Hold My Hand – Or Else
 Fat Chance (1996)
 Love on the Net (1996)
 Living with Leanne
 Calvin the Clutterbuster (1994)
 Ghost on Toast (1994)
 Tina Tuff in Trouble
 The Biggest Boast
 Hot or What
 Weird Warren
 Butterfingers (1994)
 Wally the Whiz Kid (1995)
 Britt the Boss
 Wacky Mac
 Copycat
 Back on Track – Diary of a Street Kid
 Pulling the Moves
 Tuesday Trouble

References

External links

1943 births
Living people
20th-century Australian novelists
21st-century Australian novelists
Australian children's writers
Australian women novelists
People from Geelong
Australian women children's writers
20th-century Australian women writers
21st-century Australian women writers